The Solberg Cabinet was the government of the Kingdom of Norway, headed by Conservative Party leader Erna Solberg as Prime Minister from 16 October 2013 to 14 October 2021. The government was appointed by King Harald V on 16 October 2013 following the parliamentary election on 9 September, consisting of the Conservative Party and the Progress Party as a minority government. On 16 December 2015, the cabinet was re-shuffled. The government secured renewed support following the 2017 parliamentary election. It was expanded on 14 January 2018, when an agreement was reached to include the Liberal Party, and further expanded on 22 January 2019 when the Christian Democratic Party joined the coalition. On 20 January 2020, the Progress Party announced that it would withdraw from the government, citing the decision to bring home the family of a sick child from Syria, which included the child's mother, a Norwegian citizen who had volunteered for the Islamic State.

On 12 October 2021, Solberg handed the government's resignation as a result of the majority against it following the 2021 election. The cabinet functioned as an interim government until the Støre Cabinet was sworn in.

Parliamentary support from 2013 and majority government from 2019 
The Government is a centre-right coalition. At its formation in 2013, it  consisted of the Conservative Party and the Progress Party, relying on parliamentary support from the Liberal Party and the Christian Democratic Party through a separate agreement giving them influence on policy. The Liberal Party entered the government in January 2018, and so did the Christian Democratic Party in January 2019. The Progress Party left the coalition, the first Government in which it had participated, in January 2020. From January 2018 to January 2020 the coalition held a majority in the Parliament. The government is the first in Norway since 1986 in which centre-right parties have participated in a majority coalition.

Name 
By convention, a Norwegian government is usually named after the Prime Minister, in casu the Solberg Cabinet. The Government, however, has officially referred to itself (until the Liberal Party's entering) as the Høyre Frp Cabinet. Informally, it is called the Blue Cabinet and even the Blue Blue Cabinet, referring to Høyre's light blue and the Progress Party's dark blue party colour, respectively.

Members 
On 16 October 2013, Erna Solberg's cabinet ministers were formally appointed by King Harald V.

The Cabinet had 18 ministers; two fewer than the previous Stoltenberg cabinet. It had eleven ministers from the Conservatives and seven from Progress, reflecting the parties' numerical strength in Parliament.

The cabinet had nine men and nine women. Their average age on taking office was 43. Six ministers had studies in economics, four were jurists and four had studies in the humanities or social sciences.

Seven ministers hailed from Western Norway, including Listhaug who now represented Oslo. Seven ministers (including Listhaug) represented Eastern Norway, three ministers represented Trøndelag, one Northern Norway and one Sørlandet. Siv Jensen was the only minister who was born and grew up in Oslo.

On 16 December 2015, Solberg made a cabinet reshuffle. The reshuffle increased the number of cabinet ministers from 18 to 20.

Three cabinet ministers were replaced on 20 December 2016.

On 22 January 2019, with the Christian Democratic Party entering the coalition, the government consisted of 22 ministers, the greatest number ever in a Norwegian government.

|}

State Secretaries

References 

2013 establishments in Norway
Cabinet of Norway
Cabinets involving the Conservative Party (Norway)
Cabinets involving the Progress Party (Norway)
Cabinets involving the Liberal Party (Norway)